The NASCAR Xfinity Series Drivers' Championship is awarded by the chairman in NASCAR to the most successful Xfinity Series racing car driver over a season, as determined by a points system based on race results. The Drivers' Championship was first awarded in 1982, to Jack Ingram. The first driver to win multiple Championships was Sam Ard in 1983 and 1984. The current Drivers' Champion is Daniel Hemric who won his first NASCAR Xfinity Series championship in 2021.

As of the 2016 season, the Championship has been decided using NASCAR's “Playoff” system. 12 drivers qualify for the Playoffs; race winners are automatically locked in and the remainder is set by the highest non-winners in the points standings. Drivers can accumulate points that carry into the playoffs by winning a stage or the race itself (1 playoff point for a stage win, 5 playoff points for a race win). After qualifying for the Playoffs, drivers have their points reset to a significantly higher total than non-Playoff drivers, with bonus points added appropriately for stage and race wins. This method is also used for eliminating drivers who qualified for the Playoffs but didn't advance into the next round. The Xfinity Series Playoffs start with 12 drivers in the Round of 12, then cut off the lowest 4 non-winners in the points standings after 3 races. This process is repeated with the remaining drivers for the Round of 8, leaving 4 drivers still eligible to win the championship that season. Following the Round of 8, all previously accumulated playoff points are reset, leaving the “Championship 4” drivers all with an equal opportunity to win the championship in the 1-race final round at Homestead–Miami Speedway. Stage points also do not count for Playoff drivers in the final race. The highest-finishing driver out of the Championship 4 is then declared the champion.

Overall, Thirty-One different drivers have won the Championship, with Sam Ard, Jack Ingram, Larry Pearson, Randy LaJoie, Dale Earnhardt Jr., Kevin Harvick, Martin Truex Jr., Ricky Stenhouse Jr., and Tyler Reddick holding the record for most titles, at two. Ard, Pearson, LaJoie, Earnhardt Jr., Truex Jr., Stenhouse Jr., and Reddick all have the record for most consecutive Drivers' Championships, with two consecutive championships.

By season

 Drivers in Italics have won at least one NASCAR Camping World Truck Series championship.
 Drivers in Bold have won at least one NASCAR Cup Series championship.

By driver

By Manufacturer

 Drives in Italics have won at least 1 NASCAR Gander Outdoors Truck Series championship
 Drives in Bold have won at least 1 NASCAR Cup Series championship.

Regular Season Champions 
Since 2018 NASCAR has awarded a championship to the driver in the series with the most points heading into the playoffs with 2017 being grandfathered in.

See also
 NASCAR
 NASCAR Xfinity Series
 List of NASCAR Cup Series champions
 List of NASCAR Truck Series champions
 List of NASCAR teams
 List of NASCAR drivers
 List of NASCAR race tracks

References

External links
 Xfinity Series Drivers' and Manufacturers' Champions

 
NASCAR Xfinity Series
Xfinity Series champions
Xfinity